Baliol Holloway (died 15 April 1967) was an English Shakespearean actor.

Early life
Baliol Holloway was born in Brentwood, Essex. He was educated at Denstone in Staffordshire. He was a pupil of Hermann Vezin.

Career
Holloway began his stage career in 1899 as a boy in the production of The Merchant of Venice. In 1907, Holloway joined the Benson Company. Holloway played the leading part in several Stratford-upon-Avon festivals and was leading man at The Old Vic in London from 1925 to 1928. He retired from The Old Vic in 1949. He also performed at the Open Air Theatre. He acted for the Phoenix Society. He worked alongside Edith Evans and also worked as an actor-manager. In America, he worked alongside Walter Hampden in Othello as Iago.

Holloway was known for his portrayal of Richard III in Richard III.

Personal life
Holloway married and his wife died in 1959. In 1965, Holloway refused to leave his home of 52 years in Marylebone and halted a construction project. Holloway went by the nickname "Bay".

Holloway died on 15 April 1967, at the age of 83, at his home in London.

Plays

The Merchant of Venice (1899)
The Fair Maid of the West, as Mr. Ruffman(1920)
Timon of Athens, as Alcibiades (1920)
Henry V, as Pistol (1920)
Venice Preserv'd (1920), as Pierre
Forerunners (1920), as Wolf
Volpone (1921, 1923), as Volpone
At Mrs. Beam's (1921), as Mr. Dermott
Love for Love (1921), as Scandal
Body and Soul (1922), as Procopo
The Jew of Malta (1922), as Barabas
Twelfth Night (1922–1923), as Orsino
The Alchemist (1923), as Subtle
The Winter's Tale (1923), as Autolycus
Twelfth Night; or, What You Will (1923–1924, 1927), as Malvolio
A Midsummer Night's Dream (1923–1924, 1926), Bottom
Richard III (1923, 1925, 1927, 1930), as Richard III
The Very Idea (1924), as George Green
The Country Wife (1924), as Mr. Horner
Measure for Measure (1924), as Lucio
The Maid's Tragedy (1925), as Melantius
Rule a Wife and Have a Wife (1925), as Michael Perez
The Merchant of Venice (1925), as Shylock
The Taming of the Shrew (1925), as Petruchio
Measure for Measure (1925), as Angelo
Antony and Cleopatra (1925), as Antony
The Merry Wives of Windsor (1925–1926), as Sir John Falstaff
She Stoops to Conquer (1926), as Young Marlow
Julius Caesar (1926, 1932), as Caius Cassius
As You Like It (1926), as Jaques
The Shoemaker's Holiday (1926), as Simon Eyre
Romeo and Juliet (1926), as Mercutio
Much Ado About Nothing (1926), as Benedick
King John (1926), as Philip the Bastard
The Tempest (1926), as Caliban
Macbeth (1926), as Macbeth
The Chester Nativity Play: The Play of the Shepherds (1926–1927), as Harvey
Christmas Eve (1926–1927), as Dramatist
Everyman (1927), as Everyman
The Comedy of Errors (1927), as Antipholus of Syracuse
The Whirligig of Time - An Up-to-Date Revel (1927), as Macbeth
Peace, War and Revolution (1929), as Diogenes
Pilgrim's Progress (1948), as Worldly Wiseman
Major Barbara, as Long John Silver
Othello, as Iago

References

External links

National Portrait Gallery:Baliol Holloway
New York Public Library:Baliol Holloway
TriCollege Libraries:Baliol Holloway

Year of birth uncertain
1880s births
1967 deaths
People from Brentwood, Essex
Male actors from London
English male Shakespearean actors